Ernst Strupler (3 August 1918 – 23 May 2014) was a Swiss diver. He competed in two events at the 1948 Summer Olympics.

References

1918 births
2014 deaths
Swiss male divers
Olympic divers of Switzerland
Divers at the 1948 Summer Olympics
Sportspeople from Zürich
20th-century Swiss people